Salvatore may refer to:

 Salvatore (name), a given name and surname, including a list of people with the name
 "Salvatore" (song), by Lana Del Rey, 2015
 Salvatore (band), a Norwegian instrumental rock band
 Salvatore: Shoemaker of Dreams, a 2020 film by Luca Guadagnino

See also
 San Salvatore (disambiguation)
 Salvatori
 Salvator (disambiguation), a Latin word meaning savior
 Salvador (disambiguation), a Catalan, Spanish, and Portuguese word meaning savior
 Salvo (disambiguation), a common diminutive of Salvatore